The vibraslap is a percussion instrument consisting of a piece of stiff wire (bent into a U-shape) connecting a wooden ball to a hollow box of wood with metal “teeth” inside. The percussionist holds the metal wire in one hand and strikes the ball (usually against the palm of their other hand). The box acts as a resonating body for a metal mechanism placed inside with a number of loosely fastened pins or rivets that vibrate and rattle against the box. The instrument is a modern version of the jawbone.

Invention
The vibraslap was the first patent granted to the instrument manufacturing company Latin Percussion.

The vibraslap was invented by Martin Cohen in 1967. Cohen was told by percussionist Bobby Rosengarden, "If you want to make some money, make a jawbone that doesn't break." About the inventing process, Cohen remembers, "I had never seen a jawbone before, but I had heard one on a Cal Tjader album. I found out that it was an animal skull that you would strike, and the sound would come from the teeth-rattling in the loose sockets. So I took that concept and invented the Vibraslap, which was my first patent."

Origins
The vibraslap descended from the African "jawbone". This is the lower jawbone of a donkey or a zebra which has loose teeth that rattle when the instrument is struck. The instrument was carried by enslaved people to South America where it became known as the Quijada.

Differing names
The vibraslap comes in a variety of sizes and materials and is sometimes marketed under the name "Donkey Call", "Donkey Rattle", "Chatterbox" or "Rattleslap."

Examples in well-known music

The vibraslap can be heard very clearly on the 1967 US No. 1 hit single "Green Tambourine" by The Lemon Pipers and is frequently and prominently used in the music of the alternative rock group Cake. It can be heard on a number of famous rock songs like "Crazy Train" by Ozzy Osbourne, "Sweet Emotion" by Aerosmith, "Closer to the Heart,” by Rush, ”Orange Crush" by R.E.M., "A Change of Seasons" by Dream Theater,  "Feelin' Alright" by Joe Cocker and throughout the aptly titled "Donkey Jaw" by America. It can also be clearly heard near the beginning of "The Low Spark of High Heeled Boys" by Traffic, signalling the end of the prolonged fade-in and the start of the signature piano vamp. Also notable: Brian Jones of The Rolling Stones played the vibraslap in the Jimi Hendrix song "All Along the Watchtower"; it is the thwack sound heard at the end of each bar in the intro. The vibraslap is also used in the songs "Billionaire" by Travie McCoy, "You're In" by Kimya Dawson and "I Don't Like It, I Love It" by Flo Rida. It can also be heard in "Kokomo" by The Beach Boys, "Asesina" by Okills, as well as in "Teenagers" by My Chemical Romance. The instrumental theme to the television show "Room 222" featured the sound of a vibraslap at regular intervals throughout the song.  The 1992 hit "Nuthin' but a 'G' Thang," by Dr Dre and Snoop Doggy Dogg, also prominently features the sound of the vibraslap. The vibraslap can also be heard in "Chaining Day" by J. Cole, and in the song's sample "Sho' Nuff" by Sly, Slick and Wicked. Carl Palmer, drummer and percussionist with Emerson, Lake & Palmer made use of the vibraslap. Other tunes which include the vibraslap are "Rude 69" by Let's Go Bowling, "A Fifth of Beethoven" by Walter Murphy, "I Don't Know" by Paul McCartney, "Shouldn't Judge a Man" by Skankin' Pickle, "Gone Campin'" by Harry and the Potters, and even "Feels Good" by Tony! Toni! Toné!. British band Kasabian have also used the vibraslap on a number of songs, including "Fire", "Where Did All The Love Go?" and "treat".

While recording "Sweet Emotion", Steven Tyler broke the vibraslap on the third attempt at using it. The break can be heard on the recording.

Sufjan Stevens used a vibraslap during live performances of some of his songs, most notably "Carrie & Lowell".

The vibraslap can also be heard in the theme music to the popular Channel 4 game show Countdown and is also prominently heard in the music played whilst the Countdown clock is running.

Mr. Bungle use a vibraslap in the song "Stubb (A Dub)".

Tally Hall often used a vibraslap named Henry at live shows.

Two overlapping vibraslaps can be heard in Billy Idol's "Eyes Without a Face".

References

External links

KISW Rock List of well-known Vibraslap Songs

Idiophones
North American percussion instruments
American musical instruments
20th-century percussion instruments